Sergio Akeen Campbell (born 16 January 1992) is a Jamaican international footballer who plays as a defender for Stumptown Athletic in the National Independent Soccer Association.

Career

Youth and club
Campbell began his career playing school boy football for Clarendon College. After completing secondary school, Campbell then played for University of Central Arkansas in the USA.  Campbell transferred to the UConn Huskies at the University of Connecticut in August 2012.

On 15 January 2015, Campbell was selected by the Columbus Crew in the 2015 MLS SuperDraft. Campbell was the 19th pick in the First Round of the draft. In late January, Campbell was the center of a dispute between his former club Portmore United and MLS. The Jamaican club want training compensation as Campbell was trained by United prior to moving to the United States. Campbell is the nephew of Rodolph Austin. On 12 February 2016 Campbell was waived by Columbus. On 1 April 2016 Campbell was cleared to play for the Pittsburgh Riverhounds.

International career
He made his international debut for Jamaica in 2010, coming on as a second half substitute against Guyana in Group I of the 2010 Caribbean Cup. In the next match of the Caribbean Cup, against Grenada in the semi-final, he received a red card after coming on as an extra-time substitute.

References

External links
 
 

1992 births
Living people
2017 CONCACAF Gold Cup players
Association football defenders
Austin Aztex players
Central Arkansas Bears soccer players
Columbus Crew draft picks
Columbus Crew players
UConn Huskies men's soccer players
University of Connecticut alumni
Expatriate soccer players in the United States
Jamaica international footballers
Jamaican footballers
Jamaican expatriate footballers
Jamaican expatriate sportspeople in the United States
Major League Soccer players
People from Clarendon Parish, Jamaica
Pittsburgh Riverhounds SC players
Rochester New York FC players
Stumptown AC players
USL Championship players
National Independent Soccer Association players